Makarios Djan (born 3 June 1955) is a Ghanaian sprinter. He competed in the men's 4 × 100 metres relay at the 1984 Summer Olympics.

References

1955 births
Living people
Athletes (track and field) at the 1984 Summer Olympics
Ghanaian male sprinters
Olympic athletes of Ghana
Place of birth missing (living people)